Sociomusicology (from Latin: socius, "companion"; from Old French musique; and the suffix -ology, "the study of", from Old Greek λόγος, lógos : "discourse"), also called music sociology or the sociology of music, refers to both an academic subfield of sociology that is concerned with music (often in combination with other arts), as well as a subfield of musicology that focuses on social aspects of musical behavior and the role of music in society.

Sociomusicological issues
The work of scholars in sociomusicology is often similar to ethnomusicology in terms of its exploration of the sociocultural context of music; however, sociomusicology maintains less of an emphasis on ethnic and national identity and is not limited to ethnographic methods. Rather, sociomusicologists use a wide range of research methods and take a strong interest in observable behavior and musical interactions within the constraints of social structure. Sociomusicologists are more likely than ethnomusicologists to make use of surveys and economic data, for example, and tend to focus on musical practices in contemporary industrialized societies. For instance,  proposed the hypothesis of "Biliterate and Trimusical" in Hong Kong sociomusicology.

Since the field of musicology has tended to emphasize historiographic and analytical/critical rather than sociological approaches to research, sociomusicology is still regarded as somewhat outside the mainstream of musicology. Yet, with the increased popularity of ethnomusicology in recent decades (with which the field shares many similarities), as well as the development and mainstreaming of "New Musicology" (coinciding with the emergence of interdisciplinary cultural studies in academia), sociomusicology is increasingly coming into its own as a fully established field. The values and meanings associated with music are collectively constructed by both music listeners and performers. When listening to a piece, they reflect upon their own values and use the music to make connections between their own experiences and what the piece is perceived as communicating. The sociology of music looks specifically at these connections and the musical experiences tied to the person and the music itself.

In addition, the act of making music is a social production as well as a social activity. Even if the music artist is a solo performer, the production of the music itself, took a level of social effort. From the instruments that were created to make the music, to the final production of generating a way to listen to the music, also known as the product. Furthermore, one can argue that even the distribution of the music is a social act. Some teachers are trying out more non traditional ways of teaching material, by using music to connect with their students on levels that the student can relate to, as well as "to draw illustrations of sociological concept".

Among the most notable classical sociologists to examine the social aspects and effects of music were Georg Simmel (1858–1918), Alfred Schutz (1899–1959), Max Weber (1864–1920) and Theodor W. Adorno (1903–1969). Others have included Alphons Silbermann, Charles Seeger (1886–1979), Howard S. Becker, Norbert Elias, Maurice Halbwachs, Jacques Attali, John Mueller (1895–1965), and Christopher Small. Contemporary sociomusicologists include Tia DeNora, Georgina Born, David Hebert, Peter Martin, Timothy Dowd, William Roy, and Joseph Schloss.

Alternative definitions 
In the entry for "Sociomusicology" in the SAGE International Encyclopedia of Music and Culture, David Hebert argues that recent use of the term suggests four definitions: sociology of music, any kind of social scientific research on music (e.g. economic, political, etc.), a specialized form of ethnomusicology focused on relations between sound events and social structure, and a prospective replacement term for ethnomusicology.

See also 
Choreomusicology
Music community
Music education
Music psychology

References

Sources

Further reading

 Adler, Guido (1885). Umfang, Methode und Ziel der Musikwissenschaft. Vierteljahresschrift für Musikwissenschaft, 1, 5–20.
 Beaud, Paul and Alfred Willener (1973). Musique et vie quotidienne, essai de sociologie d'une nouvelle culture: electro-acoustique et musique pop; improvisation, in series, Repères. [S.l.]: Éditions Mame. 272 p. 
 Becker, Howard S. (1963). "The Culture of ... [and] Careers in ... a Deviant Group: the Dance Musician", in his Outsiders: Studies in the Sociology of Deviants (New York: Free Press, 1966, cop. 1963), p. [79]–119. N.B.: The results are of a study undertaken in 1948–1949.
 de Clercq, Jocelyne (1970). La profession de musician: une enquête, in series, Études de sociologie de la musique. Bruxelles: Éditions de l'Institut de Sociologie, Université libre de Bruxelles. Variant title on half-title page: Le Musicien professional: une enquête. 165, [1] p. Without ISBN or SBN
 Devine, Kyle Ross & Shepherd, John (ed.) (2015). The Routledge Reader on the Sociology of Music. Routledge. .
 Hildegard Froehlich and Gareth Dylan Smith (2017). Sociology for Music Teachers: Practical Applications. Routledge. .
 Hill, Dave (1986). Designer Boys and Material Girls: Manufacturing the [19]80s Pop Dream. Poole, Eng.: Blandford Press. 
 Honing, Henkjan (2006). "On the growing role of observation, formalization and experimental method in musicology." Empirical Musicology Review, 1/1, 2-5
 Kerman, Joseph (1985). Musicology. London: Fontana. .
Martin, Peter J., (1995). Sounds and Society: Themes in the Sociology of Music and Society.  Manchester University Press. 
Martin, Peter J., (2006). Music and the Sociological Gaze: Art worlds and cultural production. Manchester University Press. 
 McClary, Susan, and Robert Walser (1988). "Start Making Sense! Musicology Wrestles with Rock" in On Record ed. by Frith and Goodwin (1990), pp. 277–292. .
 Middleton, Richard (1990/2002). Studying Popular Music. Philadelphia: Open University Press. .
 Pruett, James W., and Thomas P. Slavens (1985). Research guide to musicology. Chicago: American Library Association. .
 Sorce Keller, Marcello (1996). Musica e sociologia, Milan: Ricordi.
 Daniela Stocks: Die Disziplinierung von Musik und Tanz. Die Entwicklung von Musik und Tanz im Verhältnis zu Ordnungsprinzipien christlich-abendländischer Gesellschaft. Leske + Budrich, Opladen 2000, .
 Voyer, Pierre (1981). Le Rock et le rôle [sic]. [Montréal, Qué.]: Leméac.

External links

Popular Music and Society (archived 3 October 2000)
International Review of the Aesthetics and Sociology of Music
Action, Criticism, and Theory for Music Education
The American Musicological Society
Doctoral Dissertations in Musicology Online (archived 20 August 2006)
AMS: Web sites of interest to Musicologists (archived 16 November 2006)
The Society for American Music
Graduate Programs in Musicology
Conference on Interdisciplinary Musicology (archived 30 September 2007)
Society for Ethnomusicology
American Sociological Association (ASA)
British Sociological Association (BSA)
European Sociological Association (ESA) (archived 2 January 2008)
International Sociological Association (ISA)
International Hongkongers' Board and Councils of Musicology and Musics (IHBCM) (archived 24 January 2014)

 
Musicology
Sociology of art
Music genres